Tan Sri Andrew Sheng (born 1946) is Hong Kong-based Malaysian banker, academic and commentator. He started his career as an accountant and is now a distinguished fellow of Fung Global Institute, a global think tank based in Hong Kong. He served as chairman of the Hong Kong Securities and Futures Commission (SFC) before his replacement by Martin Wheatley in 2005.

Early life
Sheng grew up in British North Borneo (today Sabah, Malaysia). He left Malaysia in 1965 to attend the University of Bristol in England, where he studied economics.

Career
Following his graduation, Sheng moved to London and joined Arthur Andersen to train as a chartered accountant. After seven years in England, he returned to Malaysia in 1972, and four years later took up a position at Bank Negara Malaysia, where he did work involving banking regulation. In 1989 he was seconded to the World Bank office in Washington, DC; he came back to Asia in 1993 to serve as deputy chief executive of the Hong Kong Monetary Authority. After that, he was appointed to his position on Hong Kong's SFC in October 1998; Tung Chee Hwa re-appointed him in October 2003 for a further two years. In 2005, he stepped down in favour of Wheatley, who had joined the SFC the year prior after being removed from his position at the London Stock Exchange.
Sheng became president of Fung Global Institute, an independent, global think tank based in Hong Kong, in 2011.

, Sheng is also the chief adviser to the China Banking Regulatory Commission and a board member of Khazanah Nasional Berhad, Malaysia. In addition, he serves as a member of the International Advisory Council of the China Investment Corporation, the China Development Bank, the Advisory Council on Shanghai as an International Financial Centre and the International Council of the Free University of Berlin. He is also an adjunct professor at the Tsinghua University School of Economics and Management, Beijing and the University of Malaya, Kuala Lumpur.

In 2013, Sheng was awarded by the Hong Kong Securities and Investment Institute (HKSI) as honorary fellow.

In 2013, Time magazine named Sheng as one of the 100 most influential people in the world.

Since 2011, Sheng has written columns for Project Syndicate, a non-profit international media organization.

Works

Quotes
"Why should a financial engineer be paid four to a hundred times more than a real engineer? A real engineer builds bridges. A financial engineer builds dreams and, when those dreams turn out to be nightmares, other people pay for it." —Andrew Sheng, in an interview for the 2010 financial industry documentary Inside Job.

References

External links
Fung Global Institute
Biography

1946 births
Living people
Malaysian accountants
Malaysian bankers
Malaysian chief executives
Malaysian people of Chinese descent
Malaysian expatriates in Hong Kong
People from Sabah